In mathematics, the cylinder sets form a basis of the product topology on a product of sets; they are also a generating family of the cylinder σ-algebra.

General definition

Given a collection  of sets, consider the Cartesian product  of all sets in the collection. A cylinder set is a preimage of a canonical projection or finite intersection of such preimages. Explicitly, it is a set of the form,

In the same manner, in case of measurable spaces, the cylinder σ-algebra is the one which is generated by cylinder sets corresponding to the components' measurable sets.

The restriction that the cylinder set be the intersection of a finite number of open cylinders is important; allowing infinite intersections generally results in a finer topology. In the latter case, the resulting topology is the box topology; cylinder sets are never Hilbert cubes.

Cylinder sets in products of discrete sets
Let  be a finite set, containing n objects or letters. The collection of all bi-infinite strings in these letters is denoted by

The intersections of a finite number of open cylinders are the cylinder sets

Cylinder sets are clopen sets. As elements of the topology, cylinder sets are by definition open sets. The complement of an open set is a closed set, but the complement of a cylinder set is a union of cylinders, and so cylinder sets are also closed, and are thus clopen.

Definition for vector spaces

Given a finite or infinite-dimensional vector space  over a field K (such as the real or complex numbers), the cylinder sets may be defined as

When dealing with topological vector spaces, the definition is made instead for elements , the continuous dual space. That is, the functionals  are taken to be continuous linear functionals.

Applications

Cylinder sets may be used to define a metric on the space: for example, one says that two strings are ε-close if a fraction 1−ε of the letters in the strings match.

Since strings in  can be considered to be p-adic numbers, some of the theory of p-adic numbers can be applied to cylinder sets, and in particular, the definition of p-adic measures and p-adic metrics apply to cylinder sets. These types of measure spaces appear in the theory of dynamical systems and are called nonsingular odometers. A generalization of these systems is the Markov odometer. 

Cylinder sets over topological vector spaces are the core ingredient in the formal definition of the Feynman path integral or functional integral of quantum field theory, and the partition function of statistical mechanics.

See also

References

 

General topology
Measure theory
de:Zylindermenge